RNAS Burscough, also known as HMS Ringtail, was a Fleet Air Arm (FAA) naval air station which was  southwest of Burscough, Lancashire. The Admiralty acquired  of land in December 1942 and the airfield was built with four narrow runways and several hangars, being commissioned on 1 September 1943.

It was used to train for landing aircraft on aircraft carriers. Specifically, according to Aldon P. Ferguson's book Lancashire Airfields in the Second World War: "it was constructed to the normal Navy plan with four runways instead of three, all of which were only 30 yards wide instead of the RAF standard 50 yards. The extra runway allowed the aircraft to land and take off as close as possible into the wind, with eight directions to choose from. The narrower landing strips also simulated take off and landing on aircraft carriers."

The name HMS Ringtail was as for a ship because it was a Naval airfield, rather than a Royal Air Force one, and it was named was for a bird. (Note: "Ring-tail" is an informal term used by birders for juveniles of several harrier species when seen in the field and not identifiable to an exact species.)

Wartime operational history
The air station was planned to accommodate FAA day, night and torpedo fighter squadrons for their formation, training and working-up. Many FAA squadrons were based at Burscough for a period of a few weeks or months, before moving to front-line FAA bases or on to aircraft carriers for deployment in action in the European or Far Eastern war fronts.

One of the first FAA units to operate from HMS Ringtail was 809 Squadron FAA, equipped with Supermarine Seafires, it arrived from RAF Andover on 19 December 1943, then departed on 29 December when it flew its aircraft aboard the aircraft carrier .

Units
The following units were here at some point:

Post-war naval operations
RNAS Burscough closed for flying in May 1946. Thereafter, the hangars were used for the storage of aircraft engines and other FAA equipment, under the direction of RNAS Stretton (a.k.a. HMS Blackcap), until both airfields were disposed of in 1957.

Civil aviation
In the 1960s, civil cropduster agricultural aircraft, both fixed wing and helicopters, used the now otherwise inactive airfield as an operating base for refuelling and filling the aircraft's spray tanks.

Non-aviation use

As of early 2009, four naval hangars still survive in use for non-aviation purposes, and were used by the Merseyside Transport Trust, from the late 1970s until January 2012, when the charity moved to new premises within the industrial estate. The four hangars now stand empty and unused. These four hangars include 'Pentad' type hangars, and are on the western edge of the old airfield.

The site is now being developed with a large supermarket. Several historic photographs and maps of the wartime site are on display in its café.

References

Citations

Bibliography

Burscough
RNAS Burscough
Borough of West Lancashire